Down Sign may refer to:

A generic symbol for downloading, receiving data from a remote system
One of the arrow keys on a computer keyboard
Thumbs-down, a thumb signal
↓, the symbol for Logical NOR
↓, down in Combinatorial game theory

See also
Down (disambiguation)
Sign (disambiguation)
↓ (disambiguation)
Sign, an object, quality, or event whose presence or occurrence indicates the presence or occurrence of something else
Relative direction, a downward direction
Downgrade, reverting software (or hardware) back to an older version
Downlink, signals coming down from a satellite, spacecraft, or aircraft